Leila Rajabi (born Tatyana Ilyushchanka on 18 April 1983 in Vitebsk, Byelorussian SSR, Soviet Union) is a Naturalized Iranian shot putter of Belarusian origin.

She acquired Iranian citizenship and converted to Islam after she married Iranian athlete Peiman Rajabi. She changed her name to "Leila Rajabi" and decided to represent Iran instead of her birthplace Belarus. Rajabi immediately broke Iran national record in shot put, improving it about 3 metres and currently is the record holder.

Competition record

References

External links
 

Living people
1983 births
Belarusian female shot putters
Iranian female shot putters
Olympic athletes of Iran
Athletes (track and field) at the 2012 Summer Olympics
Athletes (track and field) at the 2016 Summer Olympics
Asian Games silver medalists for Iran
Asian Games medalists in athletics (track and field)
Athletes (track and field) at the 2010 Asian Games
Athletes (track and field) at the 2014 Asian Games
World Athletics Championships athletes for Iran
Naturalized citizens of Iran
Belarusian emigrants to Iran
Converts to Shia Islam
Medalists at the 2014 Asian Games
Islamic Solidarity Games competitors for Iran
Sportspeople from Vitebsk
Sportspeople from Vitebsk Region